Barentin is a commune in the Seine-Maritime department in the Normandy region in northern France.

Geography
SNCF operates a TER rail service here.

Heraldry

Population

Places of interest
 The church of St.Martin, dating from the nineteenth century.
 A museum.
 A seventeenth century fountain on the town square.
 More than 200 statues in the town, by Rodin, Janniot, Bourdelle, Drivier, Frémiet, Lagriffoul, etc.
 The railway viaduct, constructed in 1847 by Joseph Locke, with 27 arches 33m high.
 The sixteenth century chapel of Saint-Hélier.

Notable people
 André Marie, politician (1897–1974)
 Père Jacques (born Lucien Bunel), (1900–1945), priest of the Carmelite Order, Righteous Among the Nations

International relations

Barentin is twinned with:
 Petersfield, Hampshire in the United Kingdom
 Warendorf in Germany
 Castiglione delle Stiviere in Italy
 Brossard, Quebec in Canada

See also
Communes of the Seine-Maritime department

References
 Émile Lefort, Barentin autrefois, aujourd'hui, Rouen, 1933

External links

Official website of Barentin 

Communes of Seine-Maritime